An Apokpa or an Apokpi is an ancestral deity belonging to one particular clan or family, often prevailed in the Meitei religion (Sanamahism). 

Almost all the clans and the families of the Meitei ethnicity worship their ancestors having separate pantheons dedicated to them.

See also 
 Apokpa Marup

References

External links 
 https://books.google.co.in/books?id=gxqeDwAAQBAJ&pg=PA24&dq=apokpa&hl=en&sa=X&ved=2ahUKEwjHwfOrzb_wAhWB9XMBHUDUC2QQ6AEwBnoECAEQAw#v=onepage&q=apokpa&f=false
 https://books.google.co.in/books?id=-CzSQKVmveUC&pg=PA264&dq=apokpa&hl=en&sa=X&ved=2ahUKEwjHwfOrzb_wAhWB9XMBHUDUC2QQ6AEwBXoECAAQAw#v=onepage&q=apokpa&f=false
 https://books.google.co.in/books?id=tIBymmBWqgsC&pg=PA46&dq=apokpa&hl=en&sa=X&ved=2ahUKEwjHwfOrzb_wAhWB9XMBHUDUC2QQ6AEwBHoECAQQAw#v=onepage&q=apokpa&f=false
 https://books.google.co.in/books?id=bzVuAAAAMAAJ&q=apokpa&dq=apokpa&hl=en&sa=X&ved=2ahUKEwjHwfOrzb_wAhWB9XMBHUDUC2QQ6AEwAHoECAYQAw

Sanamahism
Meitei deities
Meitei culture
Veneration of the dead
Pages with unreviewed translations